Hopkins Beach is a beach on the Sunshine Coast of British Columbia, especially in the warm summer months. The beach is located in front of many private waterfront properties. Boats line the beach, mooring around 50 feet out from the shore. The beach is very sandy and pebbly. In the hot months, Hopkins Beach is very popular for swimming.

Location 
Located at the furthest east end of the Sunshine Coast, the beach faces out onto Howe Sound.

Conservation Efforts 
Students from the local school, Langdale Elementary help clean up the beach to keep it clean. Hopkins Beach	is sampled bi-weekly from May 1 to September 15

References 

Beaches of British Columbia